Sampson Hele ( – ) of Gnaton and of Halwell, Devon, was an English politician who sat in the House of Commons in 1614 and 1624.

Early life
Hele was born  into the junior line of a minor gentry family which had settled in Devon since at least the twelfth century. He was the son of Walter Hele of Lewston, Devon and the former Elizabeth Strode, daughter of William Strode of Newnham, Devon. He matriculated at Broadgates Hall, Oxford on 6 May 1597, aged 15.

Career
Upon his father's death in 1609, he inherited around 850 acres, including three manors, most of which was located in the south-west of the county, near Plymouth and Plympton. In 1614, he was elected Member of Parliament for Plympton Erle on the interest of his cousin Sir Warwick Hele. A Royalist during the Civil War, he was appointed Sheriff of Devon for 1621, and then elected MP for Tavistock in 1624 on the interest of his brother-in-law, Sir Francis Glanville.

Personal life
Hele married Joan Glanville, eldest daughter of Sir John Glanville of Killworthy, Devon. Together, they were the parents of eight sons (two who died young) and five daughters, including:

 Roger Hele, who married Juliana Prestwood. After his death, she married Sir Thomas Putt, 2nd Baronet.

Hele died before 4 December 1655 when his will, made on 10 October 1653, was proved. In it, he bequeathed more than £6,000 to his wife and children, in addition to lands he had already bestowed on them.

Descendants
Through his son Roger, he was a grandfather of Juliana Osborne, Duchess of Leeds, the third wife of Peregrine Osborne, 3rd Duke of Leeds, and later the wife of Charles Colyear, 2nd Earl of Portmore.

References

1582 births
1655 deaths
Members of the Parliament of England for Tavistock
Alumni of Broadgates Hall, Oxford
High Sheriffs of Devon
English MPs 1614
English MPs 1624–1625
Members of the Parliament of England for Plympton Erle